Tongatapu 4 is an electoral constituency for the Legislative Assembly in the Kingdom of Tonga. It was established for the November 2010 general election, when the multi-seat regional constituencies for People's Representatives were replaced by single-seat constituencies, electing one representative via the first past the post electoral system. Located on the country's main island, Tongatapu, it encompasses part of Maʻufanga (a district of the capital city, Nukuʻalofa), and the entirety of the villages of Houmakelikao, ʻAnana, ʻUmisi, Fangaloto, Popua, Patangata, Nukunukumotu, Tukutonga, and Pangaimotu.

Its first ever representative was ʻIsileli Pulu, of the Democratic Party of the Friendly Islands. Pulu was first elected to the Assembly in 2002, and in 2010 began his fourth term as MP, in this new constituency. He was elected with an overwhelming majority, appearing to make this, at present, a safe seat for the party. After the election, he was appointed Minister for Education. For the 2014 election, Pulu was deselected by the party, and stood as an independent. The DPFI endorsed Mateni Tapueluelu, who retained the seat for the party. Tapueluelu retained the seat in 2017, but lost to independent Tatafu Moeaki in the 2021 election.

Members of Parliament

Election results

2010

References

Tongan legislative constituencies
Tongatapu
2010 establishments in Tonga
Constituencies established in 2010